The Singapore Malay Chamber of Commerce and Industry (SMCCI) is a non-profit organization, established in 1956 to support the Malay/Muslim business community in Singapore.

History
The Singapore Malay Chamber of Commerce and Industry (SMCCI) was first established in 1956 as the Singapore Malay Chamber of Commerce (SMCC) by a group of Malay/Muslim businessmen, including the first President of Singapore, Yusof Ishak. Its establishment was initially intended to look after the trading interests of  the Malay/Muslim business community, however, its name was later changed to its current name in 1995 to reflect its wider scope.

In 2006, SME Centre @ SMCCI was established as a one-stop centre for local small and medium enterprises (SMEs).

In 2016, The SMCCI celebrated its 60th anniversary and helped set up global hub along with SPRING Singapore and International Enterprise Singapore which would identify food firms scale up their halal exports.

In 2018, The SMCCI collaborated with Enterprise Singapore and One Kampong Glam Association in a project led by Infocomm Media Development Authority to digitalize businesses within the Kampong Glam vicinity.

Timeline
 1956  – The SMCC was set up in an effort to uplift the Malay/Muslim enterprises. It started out with only 15 companies, with their first office located at 500 Victoria Street.
 1988 – The SMCCI's office was relocated to International Plaza.
 1995  –  SMCC was renamed to SMCCI in order to reflect its wider scope
 1997 – The SMCCI's office was relocated to 72A Bussorah Street.
 2006  – SME Centre @SMCCI is established.
 2009 – The SMCCI's office was again relocated to its current address at 15 Jalan Pinang.
 2018 – The SMCCI collaborated with Enterprise Singapore and One Kampong Glam Association in a project led by Infocomm Media Development Authority to digitalise businesses within the Kampong Glam vicinity.
 2021 – SMCCI establishes an office at 35 Onan Rd in the heart of Geylang Serai.

List of Past Presidents
 1956-1960  – Mr Haji Abdul Hamid Allwie
 1963-1966  – Mr Salleh Basharahil
 1968-1969  – Mr Zainal Haji Alias
 1970-1980  – Mr Mohd Ghazali Gaffoor
 1980-1984, 1988-1992, 1994-1998  – Mr Haji Abdul Jalil Bin Haron
 1984-1988  – Mr Syed Ali Redha Alsagoff
 1992-1994  – Mr Jamil Marican
 1999-2003  – Mr Umar Abdul Hamid
 2003-2005  – Ms Nooraini Noordin
 2005-2009  – Dato' Mohd Zain Abdullah
 2009-2013  – Mr Abdul Rohim Sarip
 2013-2017  – Mr Zahidi Abdul Rahman
 2017-2019  – Mr Shamir Rahim
 2019-Current  – Mr Farid Khan

Functions and activities 
Since its establishment, SMCCI has played an active role in the facilitation of its members’ trade activities and acts as a point of contact between local and international sellers and consumers.

SMCCI collates information on business opportunities and disseminates it among its members. Like other recognised chambers of commerce, SMCCI is authorised to endorse certificates of origin as needed by exporters. Today, SMCCI continues to work in representing the interests of the local Malay/Muslim business community and serves as a platform to create opportunities for members through regular business missions, conferences, networking sessions and activities. Now, with its subsidiary, SME Centre@SMCCI, works to strengthen capabilities and encourage local SMEs to adopt technologies and expand their business overseas.

Since 2010, SMCCI has been hosting Malay/Muslim Business Conference for sharing industry knowledge and expertise with the participation of successful Malay/Muslim entrepreneurs. In 2014, Prime minister Lee Hsien Loong and Yaacob Ibrahim, the Minister for Communications and Information attended the event as the Guest of Honor and gave a speech at the conference.

See also
Singapore Chinese Chamber of Commerce and Industry

References

External links

1956 establishments in British Malaya
Chambers of commerce
Organizations established in 1956
Business organisations based in Singapore